USS Vivace (SP-583) was a United States Navy patrol vessel in commission from 1917 to 1918.

Vivace was built as the fast private steam yacht Vixen by the Charles L. Seabury Company and the Gas Engine and Power Company at Morris Heights in the Bronx, New York, in 1904 to a design by the naval architect Charles L. Seabury. She later was renamed Vivace.

Vivace was the property of the two companies that built her when, on 18 June 1917, the U.S. Navy enrolled her in the Naval Coast Defense Reserve and ordered her delivered for Navy use as a section patrol vessel during World War I. Her owners delivered her to the Navy on 29 June 1917, and she was commissioned as USS Vivace (SP-583) on 20 September 1917.

Assigned to the 3rd Naval District, Vivace carried out patrol duties in the New York City area for a year.

Apparently difficult to maintain, Vivace was decommissioned and simultaneously stricken from the Navy List on 28 September 1918, six and a half weeks before the end of the war. She was sold as "junk" to Marvin Briggs, Inc., of Brooklyn, New York, on 16 April 1919.

Notes

References

Department of the Navy Naval History and Heritage Command Online Library of Selected Images: U.S. Navy Ships: USS Vivace (SP-583), 1917-1919. Previously the Civilian steam yacht Vivace (1904)
NavSource Online: Patrol Yacht Photo Archive Vivace (SP 583)

Patrol vessels of the United States Navy
World War I patrol vessels of the United States
Ships built in Morris Heights, Bronx
1904 ships
Individual yachts